The 2020–21 San Diego 1904 FC season was the club's second in the National Independent Soccer Association (NISA) and second overall.

Roster

Players

Staff
  Scott Morrison – Head coach

Transfers

In

Out

Friendlies

Competitions

2020 Fall season 

Initial details for the NISA Fall 2020 season were released on June 4, 2020. In late July, it was announced that 1904 FC would not be taking part in either the Fall Season or NISA Independent Cup due to concerns raised by the COVID-19 pandemic. A second NISA team, Stumptown Athletic, followed shortly after.

On September 2, NISA confirmed San Diego would return for the NISA Spring 2021 season.

2021 Spring Season

NISA Legends Cup 
NISA announced initial spring season plans in early February 2021, including starting the season with a tournament in Chattanooga, Tennessee with a standard regular season to follow. The tournament, now called the NISA Legends Cup, was officially announced on March 10 and is scheduled to run between April 13 and 25. All nine NISA members teams take part in the Spring will be divided into three team groups. The highest placing group winner would automatically qualify for the tournament final, while the second and third highest finishing teams overall would play one-another in a semifinal to determine a second finalist.

1904 were drawn into Group 1 alongside Michigan Stars FC and the debuting Maryland Bobcats FC.

Group 1 Standings

Legends Cup Standings

Matches

Regular season 
The Spring Season schedule was announced on March 18 with each association member playing eight games, four home and four away, in a single round-robin format.

Standings

Results summary

Matches

U.S. Open Cup 

As a team playing in a recognized professional league, San Diego would normally be automatically qualified for the U.S. Open Cup. However, with the 2021 edition shorted due to the COVID-19 pandemic, NISA has only been allotted 1 to 2 teams spots. On March 29, U.S. Soccer announced 2020 Fall Champion Detroit City FC as NISA's representative in the tournament.

Squad statistics

Appearances and goals 

|-
! colspan="10" style="background:#dcdcdc; text-align:center"| Goalkeepers

|-
! colspan="10" style="background:#dcdcdc; text-align:center"| Defenders

|-
! colspan="10" style="background:#dcdcdc; text-align:center"| Midfielders

|-
! colspan="10" style="background:#dcdcdc; text-align:center"| Forwards

|-
! colspan="10" style="background:#dcdcdc; text-align:center"| Left during season
|-
|}

Goal scorers

Disciplinary record

References

External links 

 

San Diego 1904
San Diego 1904
San Diego 1904
San Diego 1904